The 1978 LFF Lyga was the 57th season of the LFF Lyga football competition in Lithuania.  It was contested by 16 teams, and Granitas Klaipėda won the championship.

League standings

References
RSSSF

LFF Lyga seasons
1978 in Lithuania
LFF